Qaleh Nasir (also Romanized as Qal‘eh Naşīr, Qal‘eh Nasīr, and Qal‘eh-ye Naşīr; also known as Shahīd Rajā’ī) is a village in Miyankuh-e Sharqi Rural District, Mamulan District, Pol-e Dokhtar County, Lorestan Province, Iran. At the 2006 census, its population was 471, in 102 families.

References 

Towns and villages in Pol-e Dokhtar County